The 2020–21 season is the Abahani Limited Dhaka's 49th season since its establishment in 1972 and their 13th consecutive season in the Bangladesh Premier League since initiation of the league.
16 March 2020, All sorts of sports activities in Bangladesh were postponed due to the spread of coronavirus in the country, according to a press release issued by the Ministry of Youth and Sports. So beginning of this season was delayed.

Season review

Pre-season
Abahani Dhaka wasn’t so active in the transfer window as the club wanted to sign one or two new foreign players only. However, Brazilian defender Maílson Alves already left the club on a free transfer in September. In October, it was confirmed that the club will renew the contract of Portuguese head coach Mário Lemos. It was also confirmed that Abahani won't release any local player. Though they signed goalkeeper Shuhagh Hossain.

Players

Dhaka Abahani Limited squad for 2020–21 season.

Transfers

In

Out

Pre-season and friendlies

Competitions

Overview

Federation Cup

Group stage

Group D

Knockout phase

Premier League

League table

Results summary

Results by round

Matches

AFC Cup

Qualifying play-offs

 
Preliminary round 2

Statistics

Goalscorers

Notes

References

Abahani Limited Dhaka
Bangladeshi football club records and statistics
2020 in Bangladeshi football
2021 in Bangladeshi football